Police Reserve Hill Ward also known as P. R. Hill is a ward located under Nagaland's capital city, Kohima. The ward falls under the designated Ward No. 19 of the Kohima Municipal Council.

Attractions
Kohima Capital Cultural Center

The Kohima Capital Cultural Center is located at Police Reserve Hill.

See also
 Municipal Wards of Kohima

References

External links
 Map of Kohima Ward No. 19

Kohima
Wards of Kohima